Clarence Chester Cleveland (September 14, 1849 – January 6, 1907) was a Canadian politician.

Born in Danville, Canada East, Cleveland was educated at the Lennoxville Grammar School (now Bishop's College School) in Sherbrooke , Quebec. He was a farmer and a manufacturer of leather with his brother. He was mayor of Danville and warden of Richmond County. He was a Captain in the 54th Richmond Battalion Volunteer Infantry (now the Sherbrooke Hussars. He was elected to the House of Commons of Canada for the riding of Richmond—Wolfe in the 1891 federal election defeating future Liberal Prime Minister of Canada Wilfrid Laurier (who also ran in the riding of Quebec East). A Conservative, he was defeated in the 1896 election.

References
 The Canadian album : men of Canada; or, Success by example, in religion, patriotism, business, law, medicine, education and agriculture; containing portraits of some of Canada's chief business men, statesmen, farmers, men of the learned professions, and others; also, an authentic sketch of their lives; object lessons for the present generation and examples to posterity (Volume 4) (1891-1896)

External links
 

1849 births
1907 deaths
Bishop's College School alumni
Conservative Party of Canada (1867–1942) MPs
Mayors of places in Quebec
Members of the House of Commons of Canada from Quebec
People from Estrie